Idlib Subdistrict  is a Syrian nahiyah (subdistrict) located in Idlib District in Idlib.  According to the Syria Central Bureau of Statistics (CBS), Idlib Subdistrict had a population of 126,284 in the 2004 census.

References 

Subdistricts of Idlib Governorate